Devore may refer to:
Devoré, a fabric technique
Devore, San Bernardino, California
Devore, Indiana

People with the surname
Chuck DeVore (born 1962), American politician
Daniel Bradford Devore, (1860–1956), American brigadier general
Dorothy Devore (1899–1976),  American silent film actress and comedian
Gary DeVore (1941–1997), Hollywood screenwriter
Gary Devore (archaeologist), American archaeologist and author (also as Gary M. Devore)
Irven DeVore (1934–2014), American anthropologist
Jason DeVore, American musician and lead singer of punk band Authority Zero
Josh Devore (1887–1954),  professional baseball player
Tiger Devore (born 1958), intersex activist